São João da Vargem is a suburb of the city São Tomé in the nation of São Tomé and Príncipe. Its population is 1,793 (2012 census). It lies on the coast, 1 km northwest of the city centre of São Tomé.

Population history

References

Populated places in Água Grande District